Nguyễn Hữu Chỉnh (1741–1788) was an official during the Revival Lê dynasty in Vietnam.

Chỉnh was a disciple of Hoàng Ngũ Phúc. He had been sent to Tây Sơn as a diplomat. Nguyễn Nhạc admired him for his eloquence. Later, Chỉnh became Hoàng Đình Bảo's right hand. In 1782, Bảo was killed by Trịnh Khải, and Chỉnh fled to Tây Sơn. In 1786, he encouraged Nguyễn Huệ to march north. Trịnh lord was overthrown by Huệ. Lê Hiển Tông, the emperor of Lê dynasty, met Huệ in the palace. Chỉnh suggest that Huệ should recognized the dominance of Lê dynasty in northern Vietnam (Đàng Ngoài), and married with Princess Lê Ngọc Hân. It was accepted by Huệ, and Tây Sơn retreated from northern Vietnam. But Huệ regarded Chỉnh as a traitor to Trịnh lord, and left him in northern Vietnam. Chỉnh had to stay in his birthland, Nghệ An Province.

Trịnh Lords members took advantage of Nguyễn Huệ's absence. Two Trinh heirs, Trịnh Bồng and Trịnh Lệ (鄭棣), appeared and made their claims to the lord throne. Northern Vietnam felt into chaos. Lê Chiêu Thống, the successor of Lê Hiển Tông, asked for assistance from Chỉnh. Chỉnh led an army marched north, easily defeated Trinh army, forced Trịnh Bồng to flee and captured Thăng Long (mordern Hanoi). Chỉnh was elevated to Đại Tư Đồ (大司徒 "Minister over the Masses") and granted the title Bằng Trung công (鵬忠公 "Duke of Bằng Trung"), and became the de facto ruler of northern Vietnam just like Trịnh lords before.

After learning about actions of Chỉnh, Nguyễn Huệ sent north a general named Vũ Văn Nhậm with an army to attack Thăng Long. Chỉnh was swiftly defeated and fled together with Lê Chiêu Thống. He was captured by Nhậm, and executed in Thăng Long.

References

1741 births
1788 deaths
Mandarins of the Trịnh lords
Generals of the Trịnh lords
Lê dynasty generals
Lê dynasty officials
People of Revival Lê dynasty
Tây Sơn dynasty generals
Tây Sơn dynasty officials
People from Nghệ An province
People executed by Vietnam
Executed Vietnamese people